María del Rosario Robles Berlanga (born 1956) is a Mexican politician who served as the Secretary of Social Development in the cabinet of Enrique Peña Nieto. She also was substitute Head of Government of the Federal District ("Mayor of Mexico City") when Cuauhtémoc Cárdenas resigned from the post to run for the Mexican presidential election, in 2000. She was the first female Mayor of Mexico City.

Rosario Robles is currently involved in one of the biggest racketeering scandals: La Estafa Maestra (Master scam). The master scam is the name of a journalistic investigation conducted by the Mexican Animal Politico news service in association with the Mexican civil society organization Against Corruption and Impunity. Published on 5 September 2017, the investigation unveiled a system of 128 ghost companies through which the Mexican Federal Government diverted more than 400 million dollars through a network of money diversions that involved 11 state agencies, eight public universities, various private companies and more than 50 public servants of different levels of government.

Her term in office was highly controversial for an intensive media campaign in her government promoting her personal image, the high cost of which raised corruption concerns, and for introducing her political allies to entrepreneur Carlos Ahumada, who videotaped himself giving large cash quantities to the former politician Rene Bejarano. The scandals caused a major crisis for her party, the Partido de la Revolución Democrática (PRD). As a result, she subsequently resigned from the party. Carlos Ahumada was imprisoned, and Rene Bejarano is still free and active in politics via his wife Dolores Padierna.

Her successor as chief executive of the Federal District was Andrés Manuel López Obrador, of the same party who left after inconformity with the path the party was taking, and went into forming the MORENA party.

In 2005 she announced her intentions to run for the same office, although it is unclear under which party she would run, as her political image was affected by the videoscandals of that year. In the event, the election passed by without her participation.

In 2014 she announced that social help of the "Oportunidades" social program of SEDESOL will not be increased for mothers with more than three children, she said that the mothers have children to get more money from the program. This was criticized by the left-wing parties, even though they support family planning and women's rights, including abortion.

Robles was arrested on 8 August, 2019 and charged with stealing MXN$4,6 billion (US$250,000,000). She faces seven years in prison.

References

1956 births
Living people
Heads of Government of Mexico City
Presidents of the Party of the Democratic Revolution
Women Secretaries of State of Mexico
Politicians from Mexico City
Mexican social democrats
National Autonomous University of Mexico alumni
20th-century Mexican politicians
20th-century Mexican women politicians
21st-century Mexican politicians
21st-century Mexican women politicians